Noam Kaniel, also known as Noam, (born August 18, 1962) is an Israeli musician, singer and composer, who has sold over 8 million records, and is known for composing or performing the theme songs of many animated series including X-Men, Goldorak, The Mysterious Cities of Gold, Heathcliff and the Catillac Cats, Code Lyoko, Miraculous Ladybug, Digimon Fusion, Glitter Force, and Power Rangers.

Biography
Noam was born in Tel Aviv, Israel. He began singing at the age of eight, taking second place in a children's singing contest organized by his future most frequent collaborator, producer Haim Saban, in partnership with Yuda Talit.

While in Israel, he went on to record such major hit songs as "Gali" and "Ima Sheli"; during this period, he performed continuously.

By 1973, at the height of the Yom Kippur war, young Noam was spotted singing in front of soldiers by Mike Brant who was France's biggest selling artist at the time. Brant believed that Noam could have a successful career in France, and had convinced Haim Saban to move there to look for, record, produce and supervise potential hit songs.

Noam's first release, "Difficile de Choisir", went straight to the top of the charts. From 1972 to 1978, this was followed in succession by such hits as "Viens Maman on Va Danser", "Une Maman", "Lollipop" and other singles. Two subsequent albums followed.

In 1975, Kaniel released an album in Japan in which he sang all 12 tracks in Japanese. This resulted in his headlining a concert tour, first in Tokyo, then in Johannesburg, South Africa.

Three years later, Noam recorded France's first-ever major theme song for an animated cartoon show. The 1978 production Goldorak, a French dubbed version of UFO Robot Grendizer, was the first anime series to be telecast in France. Noam's performance earned him unprecedented celebrity status in France.

At the end of 1978, Noam Kaniel moved to Los Angeles, following Haim Saban and his partner Shuki Levy. Together, with Saban and Levy as composer/producers, and Noam usually handling lead vocals, the three artists recorded theme music and/or songs for some notable animated series during the 1980s. Notably, Les Entrechats, Popples (1986 TV series),The Fantastic Four, Superman, The Incredible Hulk, He-Man and the Masters of the Universe and its spin-off, She-Ra: Princess of Power. Levy and Saban later brought Noam together with Filmation founder Lou Scheimer and his daughter Erika to record "I Have the Power," the theme song from the 1985 series pilot The Secret of the Sword, which subsequently received U.S. theatrical distribution.

In 1980, Kaniel made his acting debut in an Israeli film, Kohav Hashahar (Morning Star), in which he portrayed an aspiring teen singer who tries to help his fisherman father out of ruin.

In 1988 he recorded and released "My Butterfly," which he wrote with his friend Alain Garcia. The song was a tribute to Noam's wife Kira, who had died of terminal cancer, at the age of 23. Shortly after "My Butterfly" was released, Kaniel abandoned his acting career, making scant appearances on French and Israeli TV.

In 1993, he worked with Saban once as a music producer (alongside Ron Wasserman) on Mighty Morphin Power Rangers.

In 1995, he took a sabbatical to return to his first real love, songwriting. To date, he has written and/or produced material for such French music stars as Mireille Mathieu, Patricia Kaas, Ophélie Winter, Hélène Ségara, Patrick Fiori, Lorie, Julie Zenatti and Lâam.

In 1998, Noam teamed up with Johnny Williams and Louis Element to create MIRANDA, a mix of technopop and dance fusion that took the European charts by storm. Miranda's first single, "Vamos A La Playa" was sold over 2,000,000 copies worldwide, and was honored as Best Italian Artist of the Year. In the next decade, Kaniel returned to writing music for animated television and theatrical films, such as Miraculous: Tales of Ladybug & Cat Noir, .

In 2011, Kaniel worked with Saban once again on Power Rangers Samurai, providing the opening theme and arrangements. Kaniel continued to work with Saban on the Power Rangers franchise with Saban Brands. Kaniel produced music for Megaforce, Super Megaforce, Dino Charge, Dino Super Charge and Ninja Steel. When the franchise was purchased by Hasbro, it was announced that Kaniel would return to produce music for Power Rangers Beast Morphers.

Compositions

Television 

Gadget and the Gadgetinis (2002, French intro only)
Pig City (2002)
L'Odyssee (2003)
Code Lyoko (2003-2007)
What's With Andy? (2003, season 2 only)
Martin Mystery (2003, theme song)
The Tofus (2004)
W.I.T.C.H. (2004)
A.T.O.M. (2005)
Pet Alien (2005)
Fantastic Four: World's Greatest Heroes (2006)
Pop Secret (2006)
Casper's Scare School (2008–11)
Combo Ninos (2008)
Gormiti: The Lords of Nature Return! (2008)
In ze boîte (2008-2017)
Monster Buster Club (2008-2009, theme song)
Power Rangers Samurai (2011-2012)
Team Galaxy (2008)
Tara Duncan (2009)
Rekkit Rabbit (2010)
Digimon Fusion (2013-2015)
Power Rangers Samurai (2011)
The Mysterious Cities of Gold (2012)
Kobushi (2012-present)
Power Rangers Super Samurai (2012)
Power Rangers Megaforce (2013)
Sabrina: Secrets of a Teenage Witch (2013-2014)
Power Rangers Super Megaforce (2014)
Sammy & Co. (2014-present)
Power Rangers Dino Charge (2015)
Glitter Force (2015-2016)
Popples (2015-2016)
Miraculous: Tales of Ladybug & Cat Noir (2015-present)
Power Rangers Dino Super Charge (2016)
Luna Petunia (2016-2017)
Power Rangers Ninja Steel (2017)
Zak Storm (2017-present)
Glitter Force: Doki Doki (2017)
Power Rangers Hyperforce (2017-present)
Power Rangers Super Ninja Steel (2018)
’’ DENVER (2018) M6
Power Rangers Beast Morphers (2019/20)
Mystérieuse Cités d’Or 4 (2019-2020) France TV
Rainbow Butterfly Unicorn Kitty (2019)
’m POWER PLAYERS (2019-2020) Cartoon Network
’m Miraculous LADY bug 4(2020/21)
’m Ghost Force  ( 2020/21)
 ’m Miraculous LADY bug 5(2022/23)
’m Ghost Force spéciaux ( 2022/23)

VARIÉTÉ/songs for other singers:

’m Vamos A la playa-Loona
’m This love’s forever-Howard Hewitt
’m Celebrate-the Temptations
’m Tu pourra dire-Tina Arena / Patricia Kaas
’m Que l’amour nous garde -Laam
’m Mes rêves disaient la vérité- Hélène Segara 
’m Fragile-Julie Zenatti
’m Vous lui dirai-Mireille Mathieu
’m Ouvre-Ophelie Winter
’m Une vie ne suffit pas-Laam
’m Jamais jamais-Laam
’m C’était pas la peine-Mireille Mathieu

Film 

Round Trip to Heaven (1992)
Under Investigation (1993) 
Til Death Do Us Part: Part 1 (1993)
Shattered Image (1994) 
Touch of a Panda (2009)
Alpha & Omega 7: The Big Fureeze (2016)

Discography 

 Chanteur
 Gali
 Ima Sheli
 Difficile de choisir
 Viens maman on va danse
 Dessine mo le bonheur
 Une maman
 Rien ne vaut le mercredi
 Aime
 Je t'attend
 Prend cette rose
 Time to cry
 My butterfly
 Goldorak
 Les 4 fantastiques
 Les Entrechats
 Les cités d'or (English version)
 Code Lyoko (English version)
 L'agence tous risques
 Shérif fait moi peur
 Mask
 Popples
 1974: Dessine-moi le bonheur
 1974: Difficile de choisir
 1975: Une maman
 1975: Viens maman on va danser
 1976: Lollipop
 1976: Prends cette rose
 1977: Rien ne vaut le mercredi
 1978: Goldorak
 1978: Le Retour de Goldorak
 1979: Albator 78
 1979: The Incredible Hulk
 1979: Spider-Man, l'araignée
 1979: Superman
 1980: Aime (French version of Fame)
 1980: The Fantastic Four
 1980: Shérif... Fais-moi peur!
 1982: Buck Rogers in the 25th Century
 1983: The Mysterious Cities of Gold (English version only)
 1985: La Chanson des entrechats
 1985: Les Entrechats sont là
 1986: Popples
 1986: M.A.S.K.
 1988: Diplodos
 1988: My Butterfly (song dedicated to Kira Kaniel, who died of terminal cancer)
 1992: X-Men
 1995: Notre histoire d'amour (with Mimi Felixine)
 2012, 2015: Miraculous Ladybug (TF1)
 2015: Kobushi (Gulli)
 2016: Sammy & Co (M6)
 2017: ZakStorm (Gulli)
 2017: Les Légendaires (TF1)
 2019: Rainbow Butterfly Unicorn Kitty (Nickeledeon)
 Dare-dare Motus
 la Vie des Botes
 BéCéBéGé
 La lucarne d'Amilcar

Sources
 www.bide-musique.com
 www.quesontilsdevenus.net
 www.radiojunior.com

References

External links
 
Noam Kaniel at Chante France

1962 births
Living people
20th-century Israeli male musicians
20th-century Israeli male singers
21st-century Israeli male musicians
21st-century Israeli male singers
Anime musicians
Israeli child singers
Israeli male composers
Israeli tenors
Israeli expatriates in France
Musicians from Tel Aviv
Israeli emigrants to the United States